Arhopala horsfieldi is a butterfly of the family Lycaenidae. It is found in Southeast Asia (see subspecies section).

Subspecies
 A. h. horsfieldi (Java)
 A. h. eurysthenes (southern Burma, Mergui, southern Thailand, Langkawi)
 A. h. basiviridis (Peninsular Malaya, Sumatra, Bangka, Borneo)
 A. h. serpa (Nias)
 A. h. palawanica (Palawan)

Etymology
The name honours Thomas Horsfield.

Arhopala
Butterflies of Borneo
Butterflies of Asia
Butterflies described in 1890